Sri Ganganagar district is the northernmost district of Rajasthan state in western India.

History
Named after Maharaja Ganga Singh of Bikaner, Sri Ganganagar district was part of Bikaner state. This was a mostly uninhabited region. The history of this district is testimony to the vision and efforts of Maharaja Ganga Singh, who visualised and built the Ganga Canal after the Indian famine of 1899–1900. The waters of the Sutlej River were brought into the region through the 89-mile long Gang Canal in 1927, turning this region into a "Food Basket" of Rajasthan.

Geography

Location and area
Sri Ganganagar district is located between Latitude 28.4 to 30.6 and Longitude 72.2 to 75.3 The total area of Sri Ganganagar is 11,154.66 km2 or 1,115,466 hectares. It is surrounded on the east by Hanumangarh district, (Hanumangarh district was carved out of it on 12 July 1994) on the south by Bikaner district, and on the west by Bahawalnagar district of Pakistani Punjab and on the north by Fazilika district of Indian Punjab.

Tehsils and other towns

Ganganagar tehsils
There are following Ten tehsils in Ganganagar district.
 Sri Ganganagar 
 Sri Karanpur, headquarters in the town of Karanpur 
 Sadulshahar
 Padampur
 Raisinghnagar
 Suratgarh
 Anoopgarh
 Shri Vijaynagar
 Gharsana
Rawla Mandi

There are total 344 Gram Panchayats in Sri Ganganagar district. Ganganagar has a total of 3061 big and small villages which are the highest in Rajasthan

Other major towns and villages
Raisinghnagar, Kesrisinghpur, Gajsinghpur, Suratgarh, Ramsinghpur (59GB), Jaitsar (1GB-A), Rawla Mandi (8PSD-B) are major towns, whereas Raghunathpura (4RM),  22GB, Lalgarh Jatan (8LLG), Ridmalsar (60LNP), Kikarwali (60RB), Buddha Johad (Dabla 5NP), Binjhbayla, Rajiasar, Patroda (11P), Sameja Kothi (17PTD), Salempura, Chunawadh (30GG), Birmana (3BMM), Hindumalkot, Zorawar singhpura, Banda colony, Bajuwala, Dhaban Jhallar (15LKS), Khat Sajwar, Mirjawala (12F), Daulatpura, Netewala (2HH-1), Ganeshgarh, Mahiyawali (4HH), Dungersinghpura, Manniwali (36PTP), Narsinghpura (49LLW), Manjhuwas (52LNP), Sardargarh (11Sgm), Sanghar (10SGR), Nirbana (3NRD), Manewala (2MNWM), Sadhuwali (1D), Sri Gurusar Modia (26 MOD), Peepasar, Naharanwali (11-12Nd), Kumpali, Gudli, Rawla Gaon (10KD), Gomawali, Khanuwali (17KND), Dhaba, Bhatiwala, Kararwala, Kararwali (8NP), Hakmabad, Banwali, Matili Rathan, Dulatpur Kairi, Kotha, Pakki, Koni, Khakhan, Fatuhi, Mohanpura, Rohidawali, Gulabewala (25F), Arayan, Lakhahakam (84RB), Khatan,  Rojhdi (2MGM), Satrana (9MD), 365 Head (2KLD), Old Gharsana (2Mld-A), New Gharsana (24AS-C+3STR) are small towns and villages.

There are 9 Panchayat Samitis and Blocks in SGNR are 
Suratgarh - 49 Gram Panchayat 
Raisinghnagar - 47 Gram Panchayat
Anupgarh - 32 Gram Panchayat
Vijaynagar - 29 Gram Panchayat
Gharsana - 36 Gram Panchayat
Padampur - 36 Gram Panchayat
Karanpur - 35 Gram Panchayat
Sadulshahar - 27 Gram Panchayat
Ganganagar - 53 Gram Panchayat

In Ganganagar District There are also 12 Sub tehsils- Hindumalkot, Lalgarh, Chunawadh, Kesrisinghpur, Gajsinghpur, Sameja, Muklawa, Binjhbayala, Jaitsar, Rajiasar, Ramsinghpur and 365 Head.

In Ganganagar District There are 1 Municipal council is in Ganganagar and 10 Municipalities are in Suratgarh, Anupgarh, Sadulshahar, Vijaynagar, Padampur, Karanpur, Gajsinghpur, Kesrisinghpur, Lalgarh Jatan and Raisinghnagar.

There are 15 Krishi Upaj Mandi Samiti in Whole Ganganagar district. These are Ganganagar Anaj Mandi, Ganganagar Fruits & Vegetables Mandi, Sadulshahar Mandi, Karanpur Mandi, Suratgarh Mandi, Raisinghnagar Mandi, Padampur Mandi, Vijaynagar Mandi, Anupgarh Mandi, Gharsana Mandi, Rawla Mandi, Gajsinghpur Mandi, Kesrisinghpur Mandi, Jaitsar Mandi and Ridmalsar Mandi..

Many towns and cities in Sri Ganganagar district are named after members of the royal family of the former Bikaner State.

Famous Places
 Shivpur Head - Shivpur Fatuhi
 Gurudwara Budhdha Johar - Dabla
 Bishnoi Mandir & Amrita Devi Park - Dabla
 Laila Majhnu Majar - Binjor 
 Airforce Suratgarh
 Thermal Power Plant Super Critical Suratgarh
 All India Radio Station Suratgarh
 Central Farm Suratgarh, Jaitsar, Sardargarh
 CCBF Suratgarh
 Shree Cement Udaipur Suratgarh
 Koni Village Border
 Hindumalkot Border
 Mawadiya Dhiraniya bayala Temple Binjhbayala
 Padpata Dhaam Dhaban Jhallar
 Chanana Dham - 4NN Chanana
 Hathiyawala Dham
 Anupgarh Fort
 Suratgarh Sodhal Fort 
 Dhab Suratgarh

Demographics

According to the 2011 census Sri Ganganagar district has a population of 1,969,168, roughly equal to the nation of Slovenia or the US state of New Mexico. This gives it a ranking of 235th in India (out of a total of 640). Its population growth rate over the decade 2001-2011 was 10.06%. Ganganagar has a sex ratio of 887 females for every 1000 males, and a literacy rate of 70.25%. 27.19% of the population lives in urban areas. Scheduled Castes and Scheduled Tribes make up 36.58% and 0.68% of the population respectively.

Religion

According to the 2011 Indian census, Hinduism is the dominant religion of the district, followed by a large Sikh population, along few followers of Islam.

Languages 

At the time of the 2011 census of India, 32.07% of the population spoke Punjabi, 26.22% Bagri, 25.56% Rajasthani, 10.17% Hindi and 2.27% Marwari as their first language.

Media 
The district has editions of state level newspapers from Jaipur, which are re-published from Ganganagar and Raisinghnagar.

"Air Suratgarh", a radio station, broadcasts programmes in Hindi, Rajasthani and Punjabi languages. It was commissioned in 1981 and broadcasts on the 918 kHz frequency.

References

External links

 Official website

 
Districts of Rajasthan
Districts in Bikaner division